The Spetses Museum is a diachronic museum in Spetses, Greece. Its exhibits cover 4000 years of the island's cultural history. It is housed in the mansion of Chatzigiannis-Mexis, which was built in 1798. The first floor is open to the public.

External links
Ministry of Culture and Tourism / (in Greek)
Ministry of Foreign Affairs
Municipality of Spetses
Greek Museums Guide

History museums in Greece
Museums in Attica